WJWT (91.7 FM) is a radio station airing a Christian format licensed to serve Gardner, Massachusetts.  The station is owned by Horizon Christian Fellowship  and is an affiliate of RenewFM.  WJWT's programming consists of Christian music and Christian talk and teaching programs such as Turning Point with David Jeremiah, and Truth for Life with Alistair Begg.  WJWT was previously owned by CSN International and derived a portion of its programming from the Calvary Satellite Network.

The station was assigned the WJWT callsign by the Federal Communications Commission on July 9, 2003.

References

External links
 WJWT official website

 WJWT Antenna photos

JWT
Mass media in Worcester County, Massachusetts
Gardner, Massachusetts
Radio stations established in 2006
2006 establishments in Massachusetts